Wdzydze (Kashubian Jezoro Wdzydzczé), also known as the Kashubian Sea, Big Water and Szerzawa, is a lake in the Tuchola Forest in the Kościerzyna County (Pomeranian Voivodeship), in the region of South Kashubia.

The lake is part of a system of linked lakes, comprising Wdzydze, Radolne, Gołuń, Jelenie, and Słupinko.

The whole lake is part of the Wdzydze Landscape Park.

The lake has many large islands (including Ostrów Wielki, which is inhabited; Ostrów Mały; Sorka; Sidły; and Glonek), the total area of which is 150.7 hectares. The river Wda flows through the lake.

The lake is said to be inhabited by brown trout, but the fish's presence in the lake is disputed by ichthyologists.

References

Kościerzyna County
Lakes of Pomeranian Voivodeship